Ganglong Township (Mandarin: 岗龙乡) is a township in Gadê County, Golog Tibetan Autonomous Prefecture, Qinghai, China. In 2010, Ganglong Township had a total population of 4,084: 2,241 males and 1,843 females: 1,112 aged under 14, 2,718 aged between 15 and 65 and 254 aged over 65.

References 

Township-level divisions of Qinghai
Golog Tibetan Autonomous Prefecture